The Ahot Ketannah ("Little Sister", אחות קטנה) is a pizmon of nine stanzas sung in the Sephardic ritual before the commencement of the Rosh Hashanah evening prayer.

The refrain runs "May the year end with her woes!" and is changed in the last stanza to "May the year begin with her blessings!" The poem symbolizes Israel by a little sister, who must suffer greatly yet remains faithful to her heavenly lover. The author, Abraham Ḥazan di Gerona (Gerondi), a cantor and Spanish poet who lived in the middle of the 13th century, probably also composed the melody, which is in the hypodorian mode.  His name appears in acrostic form in the poem.

The melody has points of similarity to contemporary airs from the Greek archipelago.

References

Sephardi Jews topics
Jewish liturgical poems